Game for Fame is a party board game where 4-16 players work with and against their teammates in a number of physical challenges to earn money. The player with the largest amount of money at the end of the game is the winner. Game For Fame was invented by David McGranaghan and Joseph Pitcher in 2010.

The game box includes 130 Money Maker cards, four pawns, cheques, four pencils, a timer, and a notepad. 

Game For Fame is available in the US, UK, Canada and The Netherlands in a Dutch language edition published by actor Julian Miller. The game is available  through the McMiller Entertainment website. It retails for USD $22.99 with free shipping. The game is directed at ages ten and over and for 4-16 players. An expansion pack is also available which includes 130 new Money Maker cards.

References

External links

Board games introduced in 2010
Party board games
board games